Laiwan (born 1961, Harare, Zimbabwe) is an interdisciplinary artist, writer, curator and educator based in Vancouver, British Columbia. Her wide-ranging practice is based in poetics and philosophy.

Life
Laiwan was born in Harare, Zimbabwe in 1961. Her family emigrated to Canada in 1977 to leave the war in Rhodesia.  She graduated from Emily Carr College of Art and Design in 1983. In 1999, she received an MFA from Simon Fraser University School for Contemporary Arts, also in Vancouver, British Columbia, where she currently lives. She is an interdisciplinary artist interested in poetics and philosophy. Laiwan has won several prizes, such as the 2021 Emily Award from Emily Carr University. She founded the Or Gallery in 1983, where her intent was to dispel myths about the impossibility of founding and operating a gallery, particularly for women.  She was chair of the grunt gallery board of directors from 2010 to 2014.  Laiwan currently teaches in the Interdisciplinary Arts Program at Goddard College in Washington State.

Artistic practice 
Laiwan investigates embodiment through performativity, writing, music, and audio works, in a variety of media. Her practice unravels and engages in the idea of presence by way of bodily and emotional intelligence. Her work is held in Vancouver Art Gallery collection, Morris and Helen Belkin Art Gallery Collection, and other private collections, and her time-based work is available from VIVO Media Arts Centre in Vancouver, and V-Tape in Toronto.

Early work 
In Laiwan's 1986 slide sequence work, The Mesmerization of Language: The Language of Mesmerization, she deals with language as a structure which has a life independent of its conveyed meaning. There are three parts to this artwork. Part One, titled "OBSESSION : POSSESSION" shows the poem Sappho 31 in both the original Greek and as an English translation. Part Two is titled "SPELL", wherein Laiwan translates the Christian prayer Our Father from sign language into words, deconstructing and breaking apart the text, phrase by phrase, word by word, and letter by letter. "Untitled", which is Part Three of the project, moves from language into images of landscapes.

In the exhibition catalogue for Political Landscapes I (1989) at Tom Thomson Memorial Art Gallery, Stephen Hogbin describes Laiwan as an artist who examines the political relationship of geography and identity.

Work

Select solo exhibitions 
Laiwan: Traces, Erasures, Resists, The Morris and Helen Belkin Art Gallery, UBC, 2022
How Water Remembers, Massy Arts, Vancouver, 2021
Fountain, The Wall at the CBC Plaza, commissioned by the Vancouver Heritage Foundation, 2015  
Loose Work, Or Gallery, Vancouver, 2008  and also at On Main, 2008 
Duet: Étude For Solitudes, YYZ Artist’s Outlet / Images Festival, Toronto, 2006 
Quartet for the year 4698 or 5760: Improvisation for four projectors, with Lori Freedman, Open Space Gallery, Victoria, 2002

Select group exhibitions 
Urban Screen, with PANDEMIA  — the movie, Libby Leshgold Gallery, 2021-2022
Thought, outside, Curated by Amy Kazymerchyk, Western Front, Vancouver, 2020
Beginning with the Seventies: GLUT, Curated by Lorna Brown, The Morris and Helen Belkin Art Gallery, UBC, 2018
Through A Window: Visual Art and SFU 1965–2015; SFU Galleries, Vancouver and Burnaby, BC, 2015 
Da Bao: Take Out, Plug In ICA, Winnipeg, Manitoba; Surrey Art Gallery, Surrey, BC, 2013 
Da Bao: Take Out, Curated by Shannon Anderson / Doug Lewis, Varley Art Gallery, Markham, ON, Mississauga Art Gallery. ON, 2012  
c.1983: Parts 1&2, Curated by Helga Pakasaar, Presentation House Gallery, North Vancouver, BC, 2012 
Everything Everyday, Curated by Bruce Grenville, Vancouver Art Gallery, Vancouver, BC, 2010 
How Soon Is Now:  Contemporary Art from Here, Curated by Kathleen Ritter, Vancouver Art Gallery, 2009 
Limits of Tolerance: Re-framing Multicultural State Policy, Centre A Gallery, Vancouver, BC, 2007 
Group Search: Art in the Library, Vancouver Public Library, Vancouver, BC, 2007 
rupture : rupture, Artspeak, Vancouver, BC

Site Specific Works 
In 2016 as part of the City of Vancouver's Public Art Program, the Coastal City series, Laiwan displayed Barnacle City, which was projected on various buildings throughout downtown Vancouver. In 2018, Laiwan started the Mobile Barnacle City Live/Work Studio, an installation created in the SiteFactory bus, which was a part of Emily Carr University's Living Labs Ten Different Things project series. Mobile Barnacle City was installed in various locations around Chinatown in Vancouver. The project also involved T’uy’tanat-Cease Wyss and Anne Riley.

Curatorial 
In 2014, Laiwan curated Queering the International, an exhibition part of the Queer Arts Festival, which took place at the Roundhouse Community Arts and Recreation Centre. The exhibition examined issues of sexual identity.

Bibliography

Catalogues 
Kathleen Ritter, How soon is now, exhibition catalogue, Vancouver Art Gallery, 2009
Liz Park, Limits of Tolerance: Re-framing Multicultural State Policy, exhibition catalogue, Centre A 2007

Reviews of Laiwan's Work 
Queer Art Speaks to love, hate around world by Robin Laurence, The Georgia Straight, July 31-August 7, 2014 Volume 48, number 2432
QAF extending its reach, draws top talent by Dana Gee, the Province newspaper, July 22, 2014
Digital Art Reflections & 10 Seconds in Time ask audiences to stop and consider by Robin Laurence, The Georgia Straight, August 21, 2012, pg. 33

Writing 
LUNG: Toward Embodying in DAMP, anthology on Vancouver’s media artists, Anvil Press, Vancouver, 2008 
Ed Pien: Drawing Hauntology feature article in Canadian Art, Summer 2007, Vol. 24 #2

References 

Living people
1961 births
People from Harare
21st-century Canadian artists
Canadian multimedia artists
Canadian performance artists
Canadian LGBT artists
21st-century Canadian women artists
21st-century Canadian LGBT people